Bingham Academy is an international Christian school located in Addis Ababa, Ethiopia.

History 
What became Bingham Academy was first established in 1946 as the "Home and School for Missionary's Children" (SMC).
In 1952 it moved from its original location in Eas Dairu to its present location in Kolfe. Over the years it has had a various number of different grades, starting with Grade 1 to 8 in 1946 to the current Kindergarten to 12. But it has changed Kindergarten by cutting them into 2 rooms for Kg1 and Kg2

It was rated amongst the top 100 secondary schools by Africa Alamanac in 2003.

Information 
Director: Kent Austell 
Secondary Principal: Alyssa Harrison 
Elementary Principal: Esther Marseveen 
Grades: Kindergarten 1 - 12
Students: Around 330
Staff: Around 40 full-time teachers.
Curriculum: Cambridge International 
Area: 8 acres (32,000 m2)

External links 

 

Education in Addis Ababa
Secondary schools in Ethiopia
International schools in Ethiopia